The landed gentry and nobility of Devonshire, like the rest of the English and European gentry, bore heraldic arms from the start of the age of heraldry circa 1200–1215. The fashion for the display of heraldry ceased about the end of the Victorian era (1901) by which time most of the ancient arms-bearing families of Devonshire had died out, moved away or parted with their landed estates.

In the 21st century, a very few ancient families remain in the county represented by direct male descendants, including Courtenay of Powderham, Fulford of Fulford,  Kelly of Kelly, Cruwys of Cruwys Morchard, Clifford of Chudleigh, Acland of Killerton and Broadclyst, Wrey of Tawstock. A few ancient Devon estates are still owned by descendants via female lines, for example Castle Hill, Filleigh, Molland, Incledon, Braunton, Hall, Bishop's Tawton, Newnham Park. In most cases, the laws of English heraldry preclude the transmission of paternal arms via a female heiress (other than in the form of quartering), thus most of these inheritors via female lines bring their own paternal heraldry to the estates inherited.

For example, the Irish arms of Gore (Earl of Arran) are now associated with Castle Hill, Filleigh, until 1958 the seat of the last male representative of the Fortescue family, which originated in Devon in the 12th century. In a few cases, however, male heirs via female lines have been required by the legator to seek royal licence to adopt his own arms and surname, otherwise destined to disappearance, in lieu of the legatees own. This was the case with the families most notably of Rolle, Basset, Stucley, Walrond, etc.

The antiquary Sir William Pole (died 1635) compiled a list of blazons of Devon families. It was published with much other material in 1791 as Collections Towards a Description of the County of Devon.

List of Devon arms
The following armorials are listed in the Heraldic Visitations of Devon, 1531, 1564 & 1620:

A

B

C

D

E

F

G

H

I

J

K

L

M

N

O

P

Q

R

S

T

U

V

W

Y

See also
Flag of Devon
Cornish heraldry
Dorset heraldry

Notes

References

Sources
Cherry, Bridget & Pevsner, Nikolaus, The Buildings of England: Devon. Yale University Press, 2004. 
Pole, Sir William (died 1635), Collections Towards a Description of the County of Devon, Sir John-William de la Pole (ed.), London, 1791.
Risdon, Tristram (died 1640), Survey of Devon. With considerable additions. London, 1811.

 
History of Devon